Haldoor Party is a Somali political party that support current president of Somalia Mohamed Abdullahi Mohamed. It supports the strengthening of the government of Somalia and the development of constructive policies. In 2019 it was registered as a political party.

See also 

 Political parties in Somalia

External links 

 Facebook page

References 

Political parties in Somalia
Political parties established in 2019